HŠK Posušje is a professional association football club based in Posušje that is situated in Bosnia and Herzegovina. The club is best known for winning the First League of Herzeg-Bosnia in 1999 and 2000, the top flight ethnic Croat league in Bosnia and Herzegovina at the time.

Currently, Posušje competes in the Premier League of Bosnia and Herzegovina and plays its home matches at the Mokri Dolac Stadium, which has a capacity of 8,000 seats. The club played in the First League of the Federation of Bosnia and Herzegovina until the 2020–21 First League of FBiH season, after which it gained promotion to the Bosnian Premier League.

Previously, Posušje won the southern group of the Second League of FBiH in the 2017–18 season, going 12 rounds undefeated to start the season. However, the club did not gain promotion after losing to Goražde in the play-offs.

Previous names of the club have included NK Zidar (from 1950) and NK Boksit (from 1963), with the current name being adopted in the early 1990s. Posušje's fans are now known as the Poskoci (Horned Vipers), but were previously known as Torcida. The stadium's name, "Mokri Dolac", means 'Wet Valley'.

Honours

Domestic

League
First League of the Federation of Bosnia and Herzegovina:
Winners (1): 2020–21
Second League of the Federation of Bosnia and Herzegovina:
Winners (2): 2017–18 , 2019–20 
First League of Herzeg-Bosnia:
Winners (2): 1998–99, 1999–2000

Cups
Bosnia and Herzegovina Cup:
Semi-finalists (2): 2000–01, 2007–08

Players

Current squad

Players with multiple nationalities

  Boris Baćak
  Arijan Brković
  Tomislav Dadić
  Josip Katavić
  Dario Krišto
  Luka Kukić
  Luka Lučić
  Frane Maglica
  Luka Marković
  Dario Pavković
  Vinko Rozić

Managerial history
 Albert Pobor
 Stjepan Čordaš
 Stanko Mršić (1999)
 Vjeran Simunić (2000)
 Ivica Kalinić (2000–2001)
 Mario Ćutuk (July 1, 2002 – June 30, 2004)
 Dragan Jović (September 4, 2006 – October 7, 2007)
 Ivan Katalinić (June 1, 2008 – December 31, 2008)
 Boris Gavran (June 24, 2008 – March 10, 2009)
  Darko Dražić (March 19, 2009 – May 11, 2009)
 Mario Knezović (June 1, 2015 – September 21, 2015)
 Damir Ramljak (October 14, 2015 – February 1, 2016)
 Leo Slišković (February 4, 2016 – June 1, 2020)
 Denis Ćorić (June 12, 2020 – September 12, 2021)
 Stipe Balajić (September 16, 2021 – March 22, 2022)
 Toni Karačić (March 23, 2022 – June 5, 2022)
 Ferdo Milin (June 14, 2022 – September 19, 2022)
 Goran Granić (September 29, 2022 – present)

References

External links
 

HŠK Posušje
Association football clubs established in 1950
Football clubs in Bosnia and Herzegovina
Croatian football clubs in Bosnia and Herzegovina
Posušje
1950 establishments in Bosnia and Herzegovina
2009 disestablishments in Bosnia and Herzegovina